Glipa quadrifasciata is a species of beetle in the genus Glipa and was first described in 1882.

References

quadrifasciata
Beetles described in 1882